William Hackett Dyre (January 28, 1888 - July 1975) was a Democratic Mississippi state legislator in the early-to-mid 20th century.

Biography 
William Hackett Dyre was born on January 28, 1888, in Kilmichael, Montgomery County, Mississippi. He was the son of Henry Dyre and Julia (Threadgill) Dyre. Dyre attended the public schools of Montgomery County, Mississippi, and attended Kilmichael Hill School and Winona High School. He graduated with a B. A. from the University of Chicago. He became a minister. In November 1915, he was elected to represent Grenada and Montgomery counties in the Mississippi House of Representatives as a Democrat, and served from 1916 to 1920. He represented Mississippi's 26th senatorial district the Mississippi Senate from 1936 to 1940. He died in July 1975. He had last resided in Cleveland, Mississippi.

References 

1888 births
1975 deaths
Democratic Party members of the Mississippi House of Representatives
Democratic Party Mississippi state senators
People from Kilmichael, Mississippi
People from Cleveland, Mississippi
20th-century American politicians